A hybrid regime is a mixed type of political system often created as a result of an incomplete transition from an authoritarian regime to a democratic one (or vice versa). Hybrid regimes are categorized as a combination of autocratic features with democratic ones and can simultaneously hold political repressions and regular elections. Hybrid regimes are commonly found in developing countries with abundant natural resources such as petro-states. Although these regimes experience civil unrest, they may be relatively stable and tenacious for decades at a time. There has been a rise in hybrid regimes since the end of the  Cold War.

The term hybrid regime arises from a polymorphic view of political regimes that opposes the dichotomy of autocracy or democracy. Modern scholarly analysis of hybrid regimes focuses attention on the decorative nature of democratic institutions (elections do not lead to a change of power, different media broadcast government point of view and the opposition in parliament votes the same way as the ruling party, among others), from which it is concluded that   democratic backsliding, a transition to authoritarianism is the most prevalent basis of hybrid regimes. Some scholars also contend that hybrid regimes may imitate a full dictatorship.

History 

The third wave of democratization has led to the emergence of hybrid regimes that are neither fully democratic nor fully authoritarian. Neither the concept of illiberal democracy, nor the concept of electoral authoritarianism fully describes these hybrid regimes.

Since the end of the Cold War, such regimes have become the most common among undemocratic. At the end of the process of transformation of authoritarian regimes, limited elections appear in one way or another when liberalization occurs. Liberal democracy has always been assumed while in practice this process basically froze "halfway".

In relation to regimes that were previously called "transitional" in the 1980s, the term hybrid regime began to be used and was strengthened because according to Thomas Carothers the majority of "transitional countries" are neither completely dictatorial nor aspiring to democracy and by and large they can not be called transitional. They are located in the politically stable gray zone, changes in which may not take place for decades". Thus, he stated that hybrid regimes must be considered without the assumption that they will ultimately become democracies. These hybrid regimes were called semi-authoritarianism or electoral authoritarianism.

Hybrid regimes have evolved to lean more authoritarian while keeping some democratic traits. One of the main issues with authoritarian rule is the ability to control the threats from the masses, and democratic elements in hybrid regimes can reduce social tension between the masses and the elite. After the third wave of democratization, some regimes became stuck in the transition to democracy causing the creation of weak democratic institutions. This results from a lack of institutional ownership during critical points in the transition period leading the regime into a gray zone between democracy and autocracy.

This has caused some scholars to believe that hybrid regimes are not poorly functioning democracies, but rather new forms of authoritarian regimes. Defective democratic stability is an indicator to explain and measure these new forms of autocracies. Additionally, approval ratings of political leaders play an important role in these types of regimes, and democratic elements can drive up the ratings of a strongman leader which is a tool these kinds of leaders did not utilize beforehand. Today, 'hybrid regime' is a term used to explain a growing field of political development where authoritarian leaders incorporate elements of democracy that stabilize their regimes.

Definition
Scholars vary on the definition of hybrid regimes based on their primary academic discipline. "Some scholars argue that deficient democracies and deficient autocracies can be seen as examples of hybrid regimes, whereas others argue that hybrid regimes combine characteristics of both democratic and autocratic regimes." Scholars also debate if these regimes are in transition or are inherently a stable political system.

In 1995 Terry Karl introduced the notion of “hybrid” regime, which was simply defined as:

According to professor Matthijs Bogaards hybrid types are: 

Pippa Norris defined hybrid regimes as:

Professor Henry E. Hale defined hybrid regimes as;

Leonardo Morlino defined hybrid regimes as;

Professor Jeffrey C. Isaac defined hybrid regimes as:

Indicators
According to Guillermo O'Donnell, Philippe C. Schmitter, Larry Diamond and Thomas Carothers, signs of a hybrid regime include:
 The presence of external attributes of democracy (elections, multi-party system, legal opposition).
 Low degree of representation of the interests of citizens in the process of political decision-making (incapacity of associations of citizens, for example trade unions, or that they are in state control).
 Low level of political participation.
 The declarative nature of political rights and freedoms (formally there is in fact difficult implementation).
 Low level of trust in political institutions by citizens.

Democratic backsliding

Democratisation

Measurement 

There are various democratic freedom indices produced by intergovernmental and non-governmental organizations that publish assessments of the worlds political systems, according to their own definitions.

Democracy Index

According to the Democracy Index compiled by the Economist Intelligence Unit there are 34 hybrid regimes, representing  approximately 20%  of countries, encompassing 17.2%  to 20.5% of the worlds population.

"The EIU Democracy Index is based on ratings across 60 indicators, grouped into five categories: electoral process and pluralism, civil liberties, the functioning of government, political participation and political culture." The Democracy Index defines hybrid regimes with the following characteristics;

 Electoral fraud or irregularities occur regularly
 Pressure is applied to political opposition
 Corruption is widespread and rule of law tends to be weak
 Media is pressured and harassed
 There are issues in the functioning of governance

As of 2021 the countries considered hybrid regimes by the "Democracy Index" are:

 Bangladesh	
 El Salvador	
 North Macedonia	
 Ukraine	
 Moldova	
 Montenegro	
 Malawi	
 Fiji	
 Bhutan	
 Madagascar	
 Senegal	
 Hong Kong	
 Honduras	
 Armenia
 Liberia
 Georgia	
 Nepal	
 Tanzania	
 Bolivia	
 Kenya	
 Morocco	
 Guatemala	
 Uganda	
 Zambia	
 Sierra Leone	
 Benin	
 Gambia	
 Turkey	
 Pakistan	
 Haiti	
 Kyrgyzstan	
 Lebanon	
 Ivory Coast	
 Nigeria

Global State of Democracy
According to the  "Global State of Democracy Report" by   International Institute for Democracy and Electoral Assistance (IDEA) there are 20  hybrid regimes. "International IDEA compiles data from 12 different data sources, including expert surveys and observational data includes the extent to which voting rights are inclusive, political parties are free to form and campaign for office, elections are free, and political offices are filled through elections." IDEA defined hybrid regimes as;

As of 2021 the countries considered hybrid regimes by the "Global State of Democracy Report"  are:
 
 Angola
 Benin
 Cote d'Ivoire
 Democratic Republic of the Congo
 Ethiopia
 Gabon
 Jordan
 Kuwait
 Kyrgyzstan
 Libya
 Mauritania
 Morocco
 Mozambique
 Nigeria
 Serbia
 Singapore
 Tanzania
 Togo
 Tunisia
 Turkey

V-Dem Institute

According to the V-Dem Institute compiled by the University of Gothenburg there are 65 hybrid regimes. V-Dem's "Regimes of the World" indicators identify four political regimes: closed autocracies, electoral autocracies, electoral democracies, and liberal democracies with both electoral autocracies and electoral democracies grouped as hybrid regimes.

According to the V-Dem Institute:

Freedom House

Freedom House  "measures the level of democratic governance in 29 countries from Central Europe to Central Asia".

"Freedom House assign scores to countries and territories across the globe on 10 indicators of political rights (e.g., whether there is a realistic opportunity for opposition parties to gain power through elections) and 15 indicators of civil liberties (e.g., whether there is a free and independent media)." Freedom House classifies transitional or hybrid regimes as;

Freedom house has  classified 11 of 29 countries analyzed as "Transitional or Hybrid Regimes";
 
 Armenia	
 Georgia	
 Moldova	
 Bosnia and Herzegovina	
 Kosovo	
 Ukraine	
 Hungary	
 Albania	
 Serbia	
 North Macedonia	
 Montenegro

Typology 

According to Yale professor Juan José Linz there a three main types of political systems today: democracies, 
totalitarian regimes and, sitting between these two, authoritarian regimes with many different terms that describe specific types of hybrid regimes.

Academics generally refer to a full  dictatorship as either a form of authoritarianism or  totalitarianism over a "hybrid system". Authoritarian governments that conduct elections are in many scholars view not hybrids, but are successful well-institutionalized stable authoritarian regimes. Democratic elements can simultaneously serve authoritarian purposes and contribute to democratization.

Electoral authoritarianism 
Electoral authoritarianism means that democratic institutions are imitative and, due to numerous systematic violations of liberal democratic norms, in fact adhere to authoritarian methods. Electoral authoritarianism can be competitive and hegemonic, and the latter does not necessarily mean election irregularities. A. Schedler calls electoral authoritarianism a new form of authoritarian regime, not a hybrid regime or illiberal democracy. Moreover, a purely authoritarian regime does not need elections as a source of legitimacy while non-alternative elections, appointed at the request of the ruler, are not a sufficient condition for considering the regime conducting them to be hybrid.

Electoral autocracy

Illiberal democracy

Dominant-party system

Delegative democracy

Dictablanda

Guided democracy

Liberal autocracy

Semi-democracy

Defective democracy

Embedded democracy

See also 

 Authoritarian democracy
 Embedded democracy
Delegative democracy
Types of democracy
Democracy-Dictatorship Index
 Hybrid institutions and governance

Notes

References

Further reading

Contemporary analysts

 

 
 
 

 Beatriz Magaloni. 2010. "The Game of Electoral Fraud and the Ousting of Authoritarian Rule." American Journal of Political Science, 54 (3): 751-65.

Research history 

The researchers conducted a comparative analysis of political regimes around the world (Samuel Finer 1970), in developing countries (Almond and Coleman, 1960), among Latin America (Collier 1979) and West Africa regimes (Zolberg, 1966). Types of non-democratic regimes are described (Linz, 2000, originally published in 1975 and Perlmutter, 1981). Huntington and Moore (Huntington and Moore, 1970) discuss the one-party system issue Hermet (Guy Hermet, Rose, & Rouquie 1978) explores how elections are held in such authoritarian regimes,which are nominally democratic institutions.

"Hybrid regimes" (Diamond 2002), "competitive authoritarianism" (Levitsky and Way 2002) and "electoral authoritarianism" (Schedler, 2006) as well as how officials who came to power in an undemocratic way form election rules (Lust-Okar and Jamal, 2002), institutionalize electoral frauds (Lehoucq 2003, Schedler 2002) and manipulate the economy (L. Blaydes 2006, Magaloni 2006) in order to win the election and stay in power.

External links 
Hybrid Concepts and the Concept of Hybridity - European Consortium for Political Research
Political regime, 2021 - Our World in Data

Mixed government